The 1949–50 Detroit Red Wings season saw the team finish in first place in the National Hockey League (NHL) with a record of 37 wins, 19 losses, and 14 ties for 88 points. They defeated the Toronto Maple Leafs in seven games in the Semi-finals before downing the New York Rangers in the Stanley Cup Finals, also in seven games.

Offseason

Regular season

Final standings

Record vs. opponents

Schedule and results

Player statistics

Regular season
Scoring

Goaltending

Playoffs
Scoring

Goaltending

Note: GP = Games played; G = Goals; A = Assists; Pts = Points; +/- = Plus-minus PIM = Penalty minutes; PPG = Power-play goals; SHG = Short-handed goals; GWG = Game-winning goals;
      MIN = Minutes played; W = Wins; L = Losses; T = Ties; GA = Goals against; GAA = Goals-against average;  SO = Shutouts;

Playoffs

Stanley Cup Finals

Detroit Red Wings vs. New York Rangers

† Played in Toronto.

Detroit wins best-of-seven series four games to three

Awards and records
 Prince of Wales Trophy
 Art Ross Trophy: || Ted Lindsay
 Sid Abel, Centre, NHL First Team All-Star
 Gordie Howe, Right Wing, NHL Second Team All-Star
 Red Kelly, Defence, NHL Second Team All-Star
 Ted Lindsay, Left Wing, NHL First Team All-Star
 Leo Reise, Defence, NHL Second Team All-Star

See also
 1950 in Michigan

References
 Red Wings on Hockey Database

Detroit
Detroit
Detroit Red Wings seasons
Stanley Cup championship seasons
Detroit Red Wings
Detroit Red Wings